Hell Cat is a wooden roller coaster designed and built by S&S Power located at Clementon Amusement Park. The coaster is 2,602 feet long and debuted late in the operating park season in 2004. Its first drop is 105 feet and can take its riders up to 56 MPH. The ride time is 1 minute and 30 seconds. Hell Cat was named Tsunami until 2005, when its name was changed to J2 due to the 2004 Indian Ocean Tsunami. The new name honored the 1919 Jack Rabbit coaster which was standing but not operating since 2002 and demolished at the end of 2007. During and after the 2005 season, parts of the track were replaced by Great Coasters International to provide a smoother ride. During the 2006 season the park only operated with one train. The other remained with Philadelphia Toboggan Coasters, Inc. for rehabilitation. During the 2006-2007 off-season, more track pieces were replaced. In 2008, its name was changed to Hell Cat when Adrenaline Family Entertainment took over ownership of the park over the previous offseason. The coaster originally closed with the park abruptly on September 8, 2019 and reopened on June 24, 2021 after the park was acquired by Indiana Beach Holdings. The ride was re-tracked during the 2021-2022 off-season.

The coaster has an intense upward helix in its short layout. The layout surrounds a catering picnic area of the park. Initially known as a "tearjerker" roller coaster at its opening as Tsunami, the coaster now has fin brakes at the crest of its first drop to cut the top speed by just a few mph, supposedly to help with rider comfort in the train and to help with the maintenance and longevity of the ride.

On clear days, riders are able to see the skyline of Philadelphia while the train is on the lift hill.

References

Roller coasters in New Jersey
Roller coasters introduced in 2004
Roller coasters manufactured by S&S – Sansei Technologies
Amusement rides that closed in 2019